Marysinek may refer to the following places:
Marysinek, Gmina Radzanów in Masovian Voivodeship (east-central Poland)
Marysinek, Gmina Strzegowo in Masovian Voivodeship (east-central Poland)
Marysinek, Sochaczew County in Masovian Voivodeship (east-central Poland)
Marysinek, Warsaw West County in Masovian Voivodeship (east-central Poland)